Scruton is a village and civil parish in the Hambleton district of North Yorkshire, England. According to the 2001 census the village had a population of 442, decreasing to 424 at the 2011 census.

History
The name Scruton derives from a mixture of Old English and Old Norse meaning Scurfa's farm or Scurfa's settlement. Scurfa was believed to have been a Viking chieftain who lived in the area.

Scruton is a Thankful Village, one of very few English villages that lost no men in the First World War.

In 1953, the last owner of the estate in Scruton, Mrs Marion Evelyn Coore, died and the whole  estate including the pub, village shop, five farms and associated houses were put up for sale. The auction was held in the Golden Lion Hotel in Northallerton. Scruton Hall was bought by a timber company for the wood within the house and after a few years in decay, was demolished in 1956.

Modern Scruton 

Amenities in Scruton include the pub, (the Coore Arms), the village hall (the Coore Memorial Hall) and the Church of England St. Radegund's church which are all venues for village activities.

St. Radegund's hosts Church of England services each week.  It also provides an acoustic venue for concerts and hosts other occasional village events. The mediaeval church, restored by architect George Fowler Jones in 1865, is a grade II* listed building and one of only five churches in England dedicated to St Radegund.

The village hall is home to Scruton Karate (Wado-Ryu) Club, Scruton craft circle, pilates and keep fit and Scruton Toddler Group, activities that take place every week. It is also home to monthly domino drives, frequent Scruton Society meetings, bi-monthly parish council meetings and meetings for other clubs and societies in the village.

Scruton also has many outdoor venues; the village green is maintained to a high standard by the parish council, and is the venue for the annual village fete. Scruton Playing Field provides villagers with a tennis court, children's play equipment and a football pitch. The playing field is home to Scruton Football Club. Adjacent to the playing field is Scruton Cricket Club, with both seniors and juniors teams at the club and weekly coaching sessions.

Scruton has an extensive network of public rights of way.  These are being maintained by the parish council with funding from North Yorkshire County Council and the support of local landowners.

Scruton has many other events in its calendar including the annual Safari Supper, bi-annual Open Gardens and Scarecrow Trail and an annual Harvest Walk.

Railway station 
Scruton railway station closed down long ago but a project, in partnership with the Wensleydale Railway and the Wensleydale Railway Trust successfully reopened the station in spring 2014. A survey of the station in 2000 by specialist railway engineers rated Scruton station as a uniquely well preserved example of the type, now mostly lost in England.

References

External links

Official website
Scruton Allotments Website
Scruton Karate Club Website
Scruton Ladies Football Club Website

Villages in North Yorkshire
Civil parishes in North Yorkshire